Helton Creek Falls is a series of two big waterfalls located within the Chattahoochee National Forest in Union County, Georgia.  

Waterfalls of Georgia (U.S. state)
Landforms of Union County, Georgia